Robert Andrew Meacham (born August 25, 1960) is an American former professional baseball shortstop, who spent his entire six-year big league playing career with the New York Yankees of Major League Baseball (MLB). Since retiring from active play, Meacham has managed and coached for several organizations in the majors and minors.

College career

San Diego State Aztecs
Meacham was originally drafted by the Chicago White Sox out of Mater Dei High School in Santa Ana, California, in the 14th round of the 1978 Major League Baseball draft, but chose, instead, to play college baseball at San Diego State University.

He was second team All-American in  after batting .375 with seven home runs, 51 runs batted in (RBI) and 44 stolen bases, and was selected by the St. Louis Cardinals with the eighth overall pick in the 1981 Major League Baseball draft. Meacham signed with the Cardinals, ending his college career as SDSU's all-time leader in runs (214), hits (277), and at bats (767), and was second in career stolen bases (116), including a streak of thirty consecutive successful steals.

Baseball Hall of Fame member Tony Gwynn credited Meacham for helping him join the Aztecs baseball team, after coming to the school on a basketball scholarship. The two played against each other in high school and Meacham, knowing Gwynn's abilities well, encouraged Coach Jim Dietz to give him an opportunity.

Professional playing career

St. Louis Cardinals
Meacham batted only .182 for the Gastonia Cardinals of the South Atlantic League in 1981. On December 14, 1982, Meacham was traded to the New York Yankees with outfielder Stan Javier for pitchers Marty Mason and Steve Fincher and outfielder Bob Helsom in a minor league (MiLB) deal.

New York Yankees
The trade turned out to be a very good deal for the Yankees, as none of the three players the Yankees sent to the Cardinals ever reached the major leagues, and Javier was later included in the December 5,  deal that brought them Rickey Henderson from the Oakland Athletics. Meacham, meanwhile, earned a major league promotion by June of his first season with his new club. He made his MLB debut on June 30, 1983, in the 12th inning of an extra-inning game against the Baltimore Orioles. The Yankees won on a Butch Wynegar walk off home run before Meacham could log his first major league plate appearance. That did not occur until his third major league game — against the Seattle Mariners, on September 3, . He lined out to Mariners third baseman Manny Castillo. By the end of the season, Meacham had won the Yankees' starting shortstop job, appearing in a total of 22 games, while batting .235 in 51 at bats.

During the off season, the Yankees acquired Tim Foli to play short in 1984. The Yankees ended up having something of a revolving door at shortstop, with Meacham, Foli, Roy Smalley, and Andre Robertson all seeing playing time at the position. Meacham emerged with the most playing time of the bunch, logging 840 innings and batting .253 with two home runs and 25 RBIs. Despite his limited role, Meacham led the American League (AL) with 14 sacrifice hits for the season. He hit just .218 in 1985 but led the major leagues with 23 sacrifice hits.

The most notable play of Meacham's career was a bizarre baserunning gaffe which also involved Dale Berra in an 11-inning 6–5 loss to the Chicago White Sox at Yankee Stadium, on August 2, 1985. With Meacham and Berra the runners at second and first base respectively in the seventh inning of a game tied at three, Rickey Henderson hit a ball that rolled to the farthest reaches of left-center field. When Meacham slipped between second and third base, both runners ended up approaching home plate in synchronized fashion, one on the heels of the other. After catching the relay throw from shortstop Ozzie Guillén, catcher Carlton Fisk tagged out Meacham to his right, then turned to his left just a split second later to do the same to Berra, completing the double play. Yankees manager Billy Martin commented, "I've never seen that in grammar school, much less a major-league game."

The Yankees were growing frustrated with Meacham's generally inconsistent play, and had acquired both Paul Zuvella and Wayne Tolleson in separate deals during the  season to replace him at short.

Yankees team owner George Steinbrenner was particularly frustrated with Meacham's injuries and lackluster play and often lambasted him in the New York press. Following the 1988 season, Meacham was traded to the Texas Rangers for outfielder Bob Brower.

Rangers, Pirates, and Royals
Meacham failed to make the Rangers out of Spring training , and was released by the club. He joined the Pittsburgh Pirates shortly afterward, spending all of the 1989 season with their Triple-A affiliate, the Buffalo Bisons, but never reaching the major league level. Meacham spent  with the Omaha Royals, the farm team of the Kansas City Royals, again failing to make the big league club.

Professional coaching career

After retiring as an active player, Meacham began his coaching career in the Royals MiLB system.

On October 14, 2008, it was announced that Meacham's contract would not be renewed for the  season. He spent 2009 with the Philadelphia Phillies organization, as the batting coach for the Williamsport Crosscutters. On October 30, 2009, Meacham was hired as the first base coach for the Houston Astros, under new manager Brad Mills.

On August 18, 2012, Meacham was released from the Astros, along with manager Brad Mills and hitting coach Mike Barnett.

Meacham was announced as the manager for the Dunedin Blue Jays on January 7, 2013.

On January 13, 2014, Meacham was named as the manager for the Toronto Blue Jays Double-A affiliate New Hampshire Fisher Cats.

On November 28, 2016, the Blue Jays promoted Meacham to manager of their Triple-A affiliate Buffalo Bisons. Meacham was fired on September 5, 2019.

In January, 2020, the Philadelphia Phillies announced that Meacham was being added to their coaching staff, serving as a coaching assistant to new Phillies manager, Joe Girardi. After a disappointing start to the 2022 season, Girardi and Meacham were both fired in mid-season.

As of 2023, Meacham is bench coach for the Triple-A Albuquerque Isotopes, affiliate of the Colorado Rockies.

Personal life
Meacham and his wife, Gari, have three children. The Meachams gained notoriety in 1985 when Yankees manager Billy Martin and owner George Steinbrenner attempted to refuse to give Meacham a day off to witness the birth of his first child.

References

External links

1960 births
Living people
African-American baseball coaches
African-American baseball players
Baseball players from California
Buffalo Bisons (minor league) managers
Buffalo Bisons (minor league) players
Columbus Clippers players
Eugene Emeralds managers
Florida Marlins coaches
Gastonia Cardinals players
Houston Astros coaches
Major League Baseball first base coaches
Major League Baseball shortstops
Major League Baseball third base coaches
Nashville Sounds players
New York Yankees coaches
New York Yankees players
Omaha Royals players
St. Petersburg Cardinals players
San Diego Padres coaches
San Diego State Aztecs baseball players
New Hampshire Fisher Cats managers
Baseball coaches from California
All-American college baseball players
21st-century African-American people
20th-century African-American sportspeople